The West Bengal Film Journalists' Association Award for Best Actress in a supporting Role is given yearly by WBFJA as a part of its annual West Bengal Film Journalists' Association Awards for Bengali films, to recognise the best actresses of the previous year.

List of Winners

Nominations

2020 

 Lily Chakravarty for Sanjhbati & Sudipta Chakraborty for Jyeshthoputro
 Rituparna Sengupta for Mukherjee Dar Bou
 Swastika Mukherjee for Shah Jahan Regency
 Daminee Benny Basu for Jyeshthoputro

2019 

 Churni Ganguly in Drishtikone
 Rituparna Sengupta in Rongberonger Korhi
 Koneenica Banerjee in Haami
 Aparajita Auddy in Haami
 Bidipta Chakraborty in Rosogolla
 Sreelekha Mitra in Rainbow jelly

2018 
Source:
 Mamata Shankar for Maacher Jhol 
 Sudipta Chakraborty for Mayurakshi
 Tanusree Chakraborty for Durga Sohay
 Neha Panda for The Bongs Again

2017 

 Aparajita Auddy for Praktan
 Anjana Basu for Abhimaan 
 Churni Ganguly for Bastu-Shaap
 Sudipta Chakraborty for Shororipu

See also 

 West Bengal Film Journalists' Association Award for Best Actress
 West Bengal Film Journalists' Association Award for Best Actor
 West Bengal Film Journalists' Association Awards
 Cinema of India

References 

Bengal Film Journalists' Association Awards
Film awards for supporting actress
Awards established in 2017